Honghao Deng (zh:邓鸿浩)  is a Chinese computational designer and entrepreneur who resides in San Francisco. He earned a Master of Design Technology with Distinction at Harvard University. He is founder and CEO of Butlr and formerly was a researcher at City Science Group, MIT Media Lab. His latest project with Jiani Zeng Illusory Material: 3D Printed Optical Textiles was selected "The best experimental design project of 2020" by Fast Company and won the 2020 Red Dot: Best of the Best, selected from 4170 entries from 52 countries.

During COVID-19 pandemic, Honghao led his team at Butlr to develop sensors to help combat the disease. These sensors are ceiling-mounted to detect body heat and track people's movements indoors. They are thought to help business understand how clients navigate their stores.

Publications 

 2019 - Diffusive Geometries: Vapor as a Tectonic Element to Sculpt Microclimates in Architectural Space.
2019 - Hypercept: Speculating the Visual World Intervened by Digital Media.
 2018 - Twinkle: A Flying Lighting Companion for Urban Safety.
2018 - Transvision: exploring the state of the visual field in the age of extreme augmentation.
 2017 - CatEscape: An Asymmetrical Multiplatform Game Connecting Virtual, Augmented and Physical World.
 2017 - MagicTorch: A Context-aware Projection System for Asymmetrical VR Games.

References 

1994 births
Living people
Chinese designers
Harvard Graduate School of Design alumni
Tianjin University alumni
MIT Media Lab people
Businesspeople from Jiangxi